William Kenneth Kiernan (July 25, 1916 – August 26, 1997) was a Canadian businessman and political figure in British Columbia. He represented Chilliwack in the Legislative Assembly of British Columbia from 1952 to 1972 as a Social Credit member.

He was born in Peace River, Alberta, the son of Herbert Wallace Kiernan and Violet Grace Griffith, and was educated there and in Victoria, British Columbia. Kiernan was married to Mary Juanita Evans in 1938. He served in the provincial cabinet as Minister of Agriculture, Minister of Mines and Petroleum, Minister of Recreation and Conservation and Minister of Commercial Transport. He died in Delta, British Columbia in August 1997 at the age of 81.

References 

1916 births
1997 deaths
20th-century Canadian politicians
British Columbia Social Credit Party MLAs
Members of the Executive Council of British Columbia